Trussville is a city in Jefferson and St. Clair counties in the State of Alabama.  It is a suburb of Birmingham and part of the Birmingham-Hoover Metropolitan Statistical Area. Its population at the 2020 census was 
26,123.

Geography 
Trussville is located at  (33.621623, -86.596404).

History

Early settlement 
The first European settler to establish residence in the area was Warren Truss, who entered the area with his brothers and constructed a grist mill on the Cahaba River in 1821. Truss was a North Carolina man of English descent. Trussville remained an agricultural community until after the Civil War, when the Alabama-Chattanooga Railway was built through the city. By 1886 a blast furnace was built on what is now the site of the new Cahaba Elementary School. Trussville was listed as an incorporated community on the 1890 and 1900 U.S. Census rolls. At some point after 1900 until its reincorporation in 1947, it did not appear on census records.

Cahaba Project 

Much of Trussville's growth and development came from the Cahaba Project, a planned development of over 250 homes constructed by Franklin D. Roosevelt's Government Resettlement Administration during the 1930s. The Cahaba Project was originally planned by staff at the Alabama Polytechnic Institute to be a rural community of small farmsteads raising potatoes and vegetables. By the middle of the decade it was decided to locate the community close enough to Birmingham to commute by public transit, so the site in Trussville was chosen. About 60 existing houses were demolished, with white residents moved to the Roper Hill community and cottages for African-Americans built on a 40-acre tract northwest of the Cahaba Project called "Washington Heights" or, more commonly, "The Forties".

Local landscape architect W. H. Kestler designed a relatively dense suburban layout with 400 houses on 1/2 to 3/4 acre lots encircling a central green space called "The Mall". The design was approved in 1936 and constructed over the following two years. In all, 243 single-family houses and 44 duplexes were constructed at a total cost of $2,661,981.26. They were rented to approved lower-middle-income families for $14-$23 per month. The village featured paved streets, sidewalks and landscaped park areas. An entrance gateway with a covered gazebo was built at the corner of Main Street and Parkway Drive to serve as the community's "front door".

Most of the one- and two-level homes were constructed in the American four-square style with brick and wood siding, pine floors and metal roofs. Each house had electricity, hot-and-cold running water, and a sewer connection. Two oak saplings were given to each household to beautify their yards. During World War II many families planted Victory Gardens to supplement their grocery rations.

Oak furnishings and appliances were also available to renters at a nominal cost from the government. A back porch was supplied with a hose for a wringer-type washer. A communal washer was also available in a separate building on the mall. Other community facilities included a swimming pool, an elementary school and a high school, all built near the mall. A co-op store was erected near the high school, serving as a general store and lending library. Several churches were founded, including the Holy Infant of Prague Catholic Church.

The Cahaba Association, the Village residents' organization, elected community leaders, raised funds for civic projects, and published the Cahaba Hub newspaper. Many residents participated in an amateur softball league which made use of a lighted field on the mall. Resentment over the privileges given to residents of the government-funded Cahaba Project resulted in tensions between them and the "Old Trussville" families, many of whom lacked electricity and indoor plumbing. The presence of so many community facilities within the project limited interactions between the project's residents and their neighbors.

After World War II the government made plans to sell the houses to residents. It also offered undeveloped parcels for sale, giving veterans the first option at 10 percent down. The Cahaba Project was added to the National Register of Historic Places in 2002.

Incorporation and growth 
On June 10, 1947, Trussville was incorporated as a town, and on May 31, 1957, the town officially became a city. It was on this date the City of Trussville was adopted as the official name.

Today Trussville is one of the Birmingham region's most rapidly growing areas. In the 30-year period between 1980 and 2010, the city grew by over 500%. It has seen much residential and retail construction, with two major shopping centers built during the early 2000s: the Colonial Promenade at Trussville on its western side and both the Colonial Promenade Tutwiler Farm and Pinnacle at Tutwiler Farm along Highway 11 at the I-59/I-459 interchange.

Demographics

2020 census

As of the 2020 United States census, there were 26,123 people, 7,562 households, and 6,094 families residing in the city.

2010 census
In 2010 the United States Census Bureau listed the Trussville population as 19,993, making it one of the fastest-growing cities in Jefferson County and Alabama. There were 19,933 people, 7,325 households, and 5,809 families residing in the city.

The racial makeup of the city was 90.3% White, 6.6% Black or African American, 0.2% Native American, 1.6% Asian, 0.1% Pacific Islander, 0.5% from other races, and 0.8% from two or more races. 1.3% of the population were Hispanic or Latino of any race.

There were 7,325 households, out of which 35.7% had children under the age of 18 living with them, 68.0% were married couples living together, 8.5% had a female householder with no husband present, and 20.7% were non-families. 18.4% of all households were made up of individuals, and 8.0% had someone living alone who was 65 years of age or older. The average household size was 2.70 and the average family size was 3.08.

In the city, the age distribution of the population shows 25.6% under the age of 18, 6.3% from 18 to 24, 24.9% from 25 to 44, 30.0% from 45 to 64, and 13.3% who were 65 years of age or older. The median age was 40.5 years. For every 100 females, there were 91.2 males. For every 100 females age 18 and over, there were 92.4 males.

Education

Trussville City Schools serve 4,269 students and are ranked among the top 10 districts in the state of Alabama by both Niche and School Digger. The mascot is the Husky, and team colors are red and gray.

Trussville schools were part of the Jefferson County School System until 2005. In 2000, a financial crisis forced the county to reduce funding for teachers, and when the city of Trussville was not allowed to offset these reductions with its own funds, it began to explore the possibility of creating a separate system. In 2004, the city council passed a resolution that created the Trussville Board of Education, and in 2005, Trussville City Schools officially separated from the Jefferson County School System.

The system consists of five schools:

 Hewitt-Trussville High School (grades 9–12)
 Hewitt-Trussville Middle School (grades 6–8)
Cahaba Elementary School (grades K-5)
 Magnolia Elementary School (grades K-5)
 Paine Elementary School (grades K-5)

Economy 
The 2014 median family income was $94,875, with 1.1% of families living below the poverty line. The unemployment rate was 5.8%, and the city's future job growth is predicted to be 32.3%. The city's sale tax rate is 10% and the income tax rate is 5%.

Approximately 88% of Trussville residents are employed in white collar occupations. The most popular jobs in Trussville are in sales and administration, which account for 28% of all positions. Management, business, and finance positions made up 24% of all jobs, followed by healthcare professionals at 9% and educators at 8%.

Trussville has seen extensive retail development over the past twenty years, especially along Highway 11 by the I-459 exit and along Chalkville Mountain Road by the I-59 exit.

Media
The local newspaper is The Trussville Tribune. The Tribune, which covers crime, government, sports and community events in Trussville, Clay and Pinson, is published each Wednesday and provides news online.

Notable people
 John Amari, judge and former member of both houses of the Alabama State Legislature, resident of Trussville and native of Jefferson County
 Jay Barker, former quarterback for the University of Alabama and NFL player with the Green Bay Packers, New England Patriots, and Carolina Panthers
 Brandon Cox, former quarterback for Auburn University
 Matt Dickey, professional basketball player
 Jordan Fisher, actor
 Brent Key, former right guard for the Georgia Tech football team and current Offensive Line Coach for the University of Alabama
 Irene Latham, author of poetry and fiction for young adults
 Mike Mordecai, former baseball player with the Atlanta Braves, Montreal Expos, and Florida Marlins
 Robert J. Natter, United States Navy Admiral
 Jason Standridge, baseball player with the Tampa Bay Rays and Fukuoka SoftBank Hawks (Japan)
 Justin Tubbs, former point guard for the University of Alabama and East Tennessee State University basketball teams

External links 
 City of Trussville website
 Trussville Area Chamber of Commerce website
 Best Towns in Alabama website

References

 

Cities in Alabama
Cities in Jefferson County, Alabama
Cities in St. Clair County, Alabama
Birmingham metropolitan area, Alabama
U.S. Route 11